Lennart A. Bohman (May 27, 1909 – October 11, 1979) was a Swedish boxer who competed in the 1928 Summer Olympics.

In 1928 he was eliminated in the second round of the flyweight class after losing his fight to Hubert Ausböck.

External links
profile

1909 births
1979 deaths
Flyweight boxers
Olympic boxers of Sweden
Boxers at the 1928 Summer Olympics
Swedish male boxers
20th-century Swedish people